Tamizdat may refer to:

 Tamizdat, literature of the Soviet Union published abroad (see Samizdat)
 Tamizdat Incorporated